Yasmin B. Kafai, Ph.D., is a Professor of Learning Sciences at the University of Pennsylvania Graduate School of Education, past president of the International Society of the Learning Sciences (ISLS), and an executive editor of the Journal of the Learning Sciences.

Life
Kafai was born in Germany and has worked and studied in Germany, France, and the United States. In the U.S., Kafai worked with Seymour Papert at the MIT Media Laboratory and was a faculty member of the UCLA Graduate School of Education and Information Studies.

Kafai is a pioneer in research on electronic gaming, learning, and gender. Utilizing constructionist theory, Kafai examines technology designs and culture, and helped to set the foundation for programmatic initiatives on games and learning. Kafai was an early developer and researcher of Scratch, an educational programming language that allows students to creatively participate as programmers in the development of virtual projects. She is also an active voice on the involvement of girls in gaming and programming and on the impact of virtual gaming on real-life social behavior in youth.

Kafai is an editor of Beyond Barbie and Mortal Kombat: New Perspectives on Gender and Gaming (2008), a collection of essays that builds on the groundbreaking book From Barbie to Mortal Kombat (Cassell and Jenkins, 2000). Beyond Barbie and Mortal Kombat presents new developments in gaming, gender, and learning, and why gender-based stereotypes persist in gaming. Kafai's 1995 book Minds in Play: Computer Design as a Context for Children's Learning helped to establish the field of gaming and learning. Kafai has also written Under the Microscope: A Decade of Gender Equity Interventions in the Sciences (2004), contributed to Tech-Savvy: Educating Girls in the New Computer Age, and written several journal and book articles.

Published Books 

 Kafai, Y. B. & Burke, Q. (2016). Connected gaming: What making video games can teach us about learning and literacy. Cambridge, MA: The MIT Press.
 Kafai, Y. B. & Burke, Q. (2014). Connected code: Why children need to learn programming. Cambridge, MA: The MIT Press.
 Kafai, Y. B. & Fields, D. A. (2013). Connected play: Tweens in a virtual world. Cambridge, MA: The MIT Press. 
 Kafai, Y. B. (1995). Minds in play: Computer game design as a context for children’s learning. Mahwah, NJ: Lawrence Erlbaum.

Edited Books 

 Holbert, N., Berland, M., & Kafai, Y. B. (Eds.). (2020). Designing constructionist futures: The art, theory, and practice of learning designs. MIT Press.
 Buechley, L., Peppler, K. A., Eisenberg, M., & Kafai, Y. B. (Eds.) (2013). Textile messages: Dispatches from the world of electronic textiles and education. New York: Peter Lang Publishers.
 Kafai, Y. B., Peppler, K. A., & Chapman, R. N. (Eds.) (2009). The computer clubhouse: Constructionism and creativity in youth communities. New York: Teachers College Press.
 Kafai, Y. B., Heeter, C., Denner, J., & Sun, J. (Eds.) (2008). Beyond Barbie and Mortal Kombat: New perspectives on gender and gaming. Cambridge, MA: The MIT Press.
 Kafai, Y. B., & Resnick, M. (Eds.) (1996). Constructionism in practice: Designing, thinking, and learning in a digital world. Mahwah, NJ: Lawrence Erlbaum.

References

External links 
Penn GSE
Yasmin Kafai
Computational Textiles as Materials for Creativity
Spotlight on Digital Media and Learning

University of Pennsylvania faculty
Technical University of Berlin alumni
Harvard University alumni
UCLA Graduate School of Education and Information Studies faculty